The Gheorghe Zane University was a private university in Iaşi, Romania. Founded in 1996, it was named in honor of the Romanian economist Gheorghe Zane.

In September 2013, Gheorghe Zane University was absorbed into Petre Andrei University of Iași.

Structure
Faculties
 Faculty of Marketing
 Faculty of Management
 Faculty of Public Administration

References

External links
 Official site

Zane
Educational institutions established in 1996
Educational institutions disestablished in 2013
1996 establishments in Romania